Archie Sproson (1890–1980) was an English footballer who played for Stoke.

Career
Sproson was born in Stafford and played amateur football with Stafford Rangers before joining Stoke in 1912. He played one match during the 1912–13 season which came in a 1–0 defeat to Coventry City before returning to amateur football with Cannock.

Career statistics

References

English footballers
Stoke City F.C. players
1890 births
1980 deaths
Stafford Rangers F.C. players
Sportspeople from Stafford
Association football forwards